Dave Mason: Live At Sunrise was recorded at the Sunrise Musical Theater in Sunrise, Florida, and released by Image Entertainment in 2002.  The 66 minute DVD is the first video release for Mason since his 1981 Laserdisc release Dave Mason - Live At Perkins Palace. This performance was also released as an audio-only CD that same year.

Executive Producers
 Pierre Lamoureux
 Barry Ehrman
 Enliven Entertainment LLC

Producer
 Dave Mason

Co-Producer and Mix Engineer
 Phil Bonanno

Performers
 Dave Mason - Vocals & Guitar
 Richard Campbell - Bass Guitar, Vocals
 Johnne Sambataro - Rhythm Guitar, Vocals
 Bobby Scumaci - Keyboards, Vocals
 Greg Babcock - Drums

Songs
 Let It Go, Let It Flow
 Only You Know And I Know
 World In Changes
 We Just Disagree
 40,000 Headmen
 Look At You, Look At Me
 Dear Mr. Fantasy
 All Along the Watchtower
 Feelin' Alright

External links
Dave Mason website
Johnne Sambataro website
Image Entertainment website
Richard Campbell website

References

Concert films